Peter Paul Brennan (November 1, 1941–August 1, 2016) was an American bishop in the Independent Catholic movement. He was Bishop of New York for the Old Catholic Confederation, a bishop of the Ecumenical Catholic Diocese of the Americas, bishop of the African Orthodox Church, primate of the Order of Corporate Reunion, and president of Married Priests Now! (founded by excommunicated Roman Catholic archbishop Emmanuel Milingo).

Biography
Brennan was born on November 1, 1941. In his adulthood, he attended St. John's Atonement Seminary, which closed in 1967.

Although Brennan had previously been ordained within an Old Catholic denomination, in 2006 he was consecrated a bishop "sub conditione", with four other married priests, by Emmanuel Milingo—then Roman Catholic archbishop of Lusaka in Zambia. As these ordinations were done without papal approval, Milingo was excommunicated and eventually laicized.

Regarding Brennan's episcopal ordination by Milingo the Holy See Press Office declared, in a carefully worded statement that: "While expressing hope for their conversion, the Church reaffirms what was declared on 26 September 2006, namely that she does not recognize these ordinations, nor does she intend to recognize them, or any subsequent ordinations based on them, in the future. Hence the canonical status of the supposed bishops remains as it was prior to the ordination conferred by Archbishop Milingo."

This denial of canonical status means that Brennan had no authority to exercise any ministry in the Roman Catholic Church. The Reverend Ciro Benedettini of the Holy See Press Office, who was responsible for publicly issuing the press conference communique on Milingo, told reporters that any ordinations that the excommunicated Milingo had performed prior to his laicization were "illicit but valid", while any subsequent ordinations would be invalid.

On June 11, 2011, the Pontifical Council for Legislative Texts issued a statement about illicitly ordained bishops, pointing out the canons which provide for an automatic latae sententiae excommunication for both the ordaining bishop and those ordained. Bishop Juan Ignacio Arrieta, secretary of the council, explained that the statement applied to the bishops ordained by Milingo as well as to more recent cases in the Chinese Patriotic Association.

After the resignation of Bertil Persson as leader of the Order of Corporate Reunion, Brennan succeeded as primate. Brennan died on August 1, 2016, and was subsequently succeeded by Michael Kline as primate of the Order of Corporate Reunion.

References 

1941 births
2016 deaths
American Old Catholic bishops